Duzhou class dispatch boat (YFL) is a class of naval auxiliary ship currently in service with the People's Liberation Army Navy (PLAN), and has received NATO reporting name Duzhou class (渡舟 in Chinese, meaning Ferry Ship), with the exact type still remains unknown, and only a single unit of this class have been confirmed in active service as of mid-2010s.

Ships of this class in PLAN service are designated by a combination of two Chinese characters followed by a two-digit number. The second Chinese character is Jiao (交), short for Jiao-Tong-Ting (交通艇), meaning dispatch boat (ferry) in Chinese, because these ships are classified as dispatch boats. The first Chinese character denotes which fleet the ship is in service with, with East (Dong, 东) for East Sea Fleet, North (Bei, 北) for North Sea Fleet, and South (Nan, 南) for South Sea Fleet. However, the pennant numbers are subject to change due to changes of Chinese naval ships naming convention, or when units are transferred to different fleets.

References

Auxiliary ships of the People's Liberation Army Navy